Atlantilux is a genus of sea snails, marine gastropod mollusks, in the family Costellariidae, the ribbed miters.

Species
Species within the genus Atlantilux include:
 Atlantilux ampla Huang, 2015
 Atlantilux exigua (C. B. Adams, 1845)
 Atlantilux gemmata (G. B. Sowerby II, 1874)
 Atlantilux narcisselli Huang, 2015
 Atlantilux nodospicula (Cernohorsky, 1970)
 Atlantilux puella (Reeve, 1845)
 Atlantilux rubra (Broderip, 1836)

Classification
Biota 
Animalia (Kingdom)
Mollusca (Phylum)
Gastropoda (Class)
Caenogastropoda (Subclass)
Neogastropoda (Order)
Turbinelloidea (Superfamily)
Constellariidae (Family)
Atlantilux (Genus)

References

External links
 Fedosov A.E., Puillandre N., Herrmann M., Dgebuadze P. & Bouchet P. (2017). Phylogeny, systematics, and evolution of the family Costellariidae (Gastropoda: Neogastropoda). Zoological Journal of the Linnean Society. 179(3): 541-626

Costellariidae
Gastropod genera